Black Butte, el.  is the highest peak in the Gravelly Range in Madison County, Montana.

See also
 Mountains in Madison County, Montana

Notes

Mountains of Madison County, Montana
Mountains of Montana